The Philippine pygmy squirrel (Exilisciurus concinnus) is a species of rodent in the family Sciuridae. It is endemic to the Philippines.

References

Thorington, R. W. Jr. and R. S. Hoffman. 2005. Family Sciuridae. pp. 754–818 in Mammal Species of the World a Taxonomic and Geographic Reference. D. E. Wilson and D. M. Reeder eds. Johns Hopkins University Press, Baltimore.

Exilisciurus
Endemic fauna of the Philippines
Rodents of the Philippines
Least concern biota of Oceania
Taxonomy articles created by Polbot
Mammals described in 1888
Taxa named by Oldfield Thomas